Monte Rusta is a mountain of the Veneto, Italy. It has an elevation of 396 metres.

Mountains of Veneto